This is Me is the seventh studio album by jazz guitarist Emily Remler. It was her first excursion into electric jazz-pop  and her last recording, completed shortly before her death. It is an ambitious production in which up to 14 musicians participated at the 11 original Remler cuts that make up this work.

Reception

AllMusic praised Remler's "musical integrity" and "the warm and lyrical nature of her playing."

Jazz musician and critic Leonard Feather questioned how much of the album had been "shaped by [Remler's] arrangers or co-writers (David Benoit, Russ Freeman et al) and whether she really felt this was her finest hour."

Jesse Sendejas Jr. of the Houston Press wrote that the album's "11 tracks showcase [Remler's] versatility," and stated: "Especially against the crossover-ready frameworks of the songs, you can hear every sound Remler studied over the years, her interpretations of all she took in while falling in love with jazz at Berklee or from playing in dimly-lit New Orleans music halls."

Gear Diary's Michael Anderson commented: "This is my absolute favorite recording of hers – she brings the chops, vision, harmonic technique, compositional acumen and style of East to Wes fully to bear in a new realm – and the results are one of the best albums of the genre. The melodies are catchy, solos are inventive, and best of all – it is more guitar-centric than ever without being an ego trip."

Track listing
All compositions by Emily Remler

Personnel 
 Emily Remler – electric guitar (tracks: 1-9, 11), guitar synthesizer (track 10)
 Romero Lubambo – acoustic guitar (tracks 9, 10)
 David Benoit – keyboards (tracks 1, 4)
 Aydin Esen – keyboards, piano (track 5)
 Bill O'Conell – piano (tracks 2, 3, 7, 9, 10)
 Jay Ashby – trombone (tracks 3, 5, 7, 9, 10), percussion (track 2)
 Jimmy Johnson – bass (tracks 1, 4)
 Lincoln Goines – bass (tracks 2, 3, 5, 7, 9, 10)
 Jeff Porcaro – drums (tracks 1, 4)
 Daduka Fonseca – drums (tracks 9, 10)
 Ricky Sebastian – drums (tracks 2, 3, 5, 7)
 Jeffrey Weber – percussion (tracks 1, 4)
 Luis Conte – percussion (tracks 1, 4, 6, 8, 11)
 Edson Aparecido da Silva ("Café") – percussion (tracks 2, 3, 9, 10)
 Maúcha Adnet – vocals (track 10)

References

1990 albums
Emily Remler albums